Johnson Springs  is a spring  east of the county seat Munfordville Kentucky, U.S. It is reached via a winding trail starting in Thelma Stovall Park, also known as Green River Park & Arboretum, Munfordville. (When facing the main highway in the Johnson Springs area, the springs are on the right.)

The blow hole  from Green River is a seep blue hole aquifer, which forms the source of a minor tributary of Green River. The banks have been washed to expose 350 million-year-old  fossils from the Cambrian Period. The stream is part of a large karst topography that covers a geologic watershed around Mammoth Cave and its underground rivers. The same limestone seep created the extensive streams and cave system of Mammoth Caves.

The vegetation includes mature sycamore trees, ferns, and moss. The constant temperate climate causes a humid mist to cover the area in summer. The roots can be observed floating near the water's surface in large outgrowths. Thousands of gallons of fresh water gush from the system's source daily. The water stays  year-round.

The springs are on private land.

References

Springs of Kentucky
Bodies of water of Hart County, Kentucky